Béatrice Piron (born 30 August 1965) is a French politician of La République En Marche! (LREM) who has been serving as a member of the National Assembly since 18 June 2017, representing the department of Yvelines.

Political career
In parliament, Piron serves on the Committee on Cultural Affairs and Education. In addition to her committee assignments, she is part of the French-Japanese Parliamentary Friendship Group, the French-Singaporean Parliamentary Friendship Group, the French-Bahraini Parliamentary Friendship Group, and the French-Qatari Parliamentary Friendship Group.

Since 2020, Piron has been serving – alongside Stella Dupont – as one of two treasurers of the LREM parliamentary group under chairman Christophe Castaner.

Other activities
 Agency for French Education Abroad (AEFE), Member of the Board of Directors

See also
 2017 French legislative election

References

Living people
Deputies of the 15th National Assembly of the French Fifth Republic
La République En Marche! politicians
21st-century French women politicians
Place of birth missing (living people)
Women members of the National Assembly (France)
1965 births
Members of Parliament for Yvelines
Deputies of the 16th National Assembly of the French Fifth Republic